is one of the official 29 grappling techniques of Kodokan Judo. It is one of the nine joint techniques of the Kansetsu-waza list, one of the three grappling lists in Judo's Katame-waza enumerating 29 grappling techniques. All of Judo's competition legal joint techniques are arm locks.

Similar Techniques, Variants, and Aliases 
Variants or Aliases:
Kata osae tai gatame ude kujiki
Kata osae tai gatame ude kujiki is a joint hold demonstrated in The Essence Of Judo feat. Kyuzo Mifune.
Examples of contests this finished
2018 Judo Grand Prix Zagreb men U66kg Round 1
Win Dzmitry Shershan(Belarus) (3:32　Hara gatame) Imad Bassou(Morocco) Loss　IJF movie

IJF Official Names:
Ude Hishigi Hara Gatame(腕挫腹固)
U.H. hara gatame
Hara gatame(腹固)
HGA

Alias: 
Stomach Armlock

Included Systems 

Judo

Technique History

References

External links
Judo Techniques
Judo Lists
Mifune's Goshin Jutsu

Judo technique